Caramella is a studio album by the Italian singer, Mina. It was released by PDU on May 25, 2010. Published only seven months after her previous album Facile, and two months after her 70th birthday, this album is one of diverse sounds, styles, and authors. The album has fourteen tracks, which include twelve previously unreleased songs, and one ghost track. It debuted at the third position of the official Italian classification system FIMI, and with more than 30,000 copies sold, it was certified gold.

Track listing 
 You Get Me - (feat. Seal) - 4:53 - (Pam Sheyne-Teitur Lassen)
 Io e Te - 4:57 - (Paolo Benvegnù-Andrea Franchi-Gionni Dall'Orto)
 Il Povero e Il Re - 4:35 - (Axel Pani)
 Poche Parole - (feat. Giorgia) - 4:08 - (Giorgia-Emanuel Lo)
 Amore Disperato - (feat. Lucio Dalla) - 4:28 - (Lucio Dalla)
 Così Così - 5:19 - (Samuele Cerri-Massimo Moriconi)
 Solo se Sai Rispondere - 4:00 - (Massimiliano Casacci)
 Come se Io Fossi Lì - 3:47 - (Mauro Santoro)
 La Clessidra - 4:24 - (Davide Dileo)
 Accendi Questa Luce - 4:34 - (Andrea Mingardi-Maurizio Tirelli)
 Amoreunicoamore - 4:03 - (Fabrizio Berlincioni-Silvio Amato)
 Ma Comme Faje - 4:18 - (Maurizio Morante)
 Inutile Sperare - 4:31 - (Maurizio Morante-Massimo Culotta)
 Mi Piacerebbe Andare al Mare - 4:30 - (Andrea Mingardi-Maurizio Tirelli)You Get Me (solo version - Mina's ghost track) - 4:53 - (Pam Sheyne-Teitur Lassen)

Certifications

References

External links
Mina Mazzini official website

2010 albums
Mina (Italian singer) albums